Bala Şahağac (also, Balaca Şahağac) is a village and municipality in the Astara Rayon of Azerbaijan. It has a population of 1,379.  The municipality consists of the villages of Bala Şahağac and Qamışovka.

References

Populated places in Astara District